Condition is the second studio album of British band Spectres, released on 10 March 2017 on the label Sonic Cathedral. It was tracked by Dominic Mitchison in Bristol and mastered by Mogwai and 65daysofstatic client Frank Arkwright at Abbey Road Studios. The album was positively received.

Track list

References 

2017 albums